Pentachlaena is a genus of flowering plant belonging to the Sarcolaenaceae family, endemic to Madagascar. It was first scientifically described in 1920.

Species
The genus includes the following species:
 Pentachlaena betamponensis  2000
 Pentachlaena latifolia  1920
 Pentachlaena orientalis  1973
 Pentachlaena vestita  2016

References

Sarcolaenaceae
Malvales genera
Endemic flora of Madagascar
Taxa named by Joseph Marie Henry Alfred Perrier de la Bâthie